Harley Facades is a British construction company that designs and installs external cladding on buildings.

Ray Bailey, the owner and managing director, founded the first Harley business (Harley Curtain Wall) in 1996, operating from home and "offering a limited range of aluminium windows and curtain wall products".

In 2002, Harley obtained its first major cladding contract, with Wates Construction to over-clad four 11-storey tower blocks in Croydon, which led it to establish a specialist cladding division focused on local authority and housing association blocks in London and the south-east. The company moved to purpose built office in December 2013 - Harley House, Brooklands Park, Farningham Road, Crowborough, East Sussex.

Grenfell Tower 
In 2015, Harley secured a £2.6m contract from Rydon to design and supply the ACM panels at Grenfell Tower. In September 2015 the company Harley Curtain Wall Ltd (Company Number 03244209) was formally placed into administration, owing around £1m to its unsecured trade creditors and had appointed Begbies Traynor as administrators. 

Within days, as part of a Pre-packaged insolvency deal, the company's assets were purchased for £24,900 plus VAT by Harley Facades Limited, a similarly-named company, also owned by Ray Bailey since 2001 but which had been dormant until 2015. The Grenfell Tower contract was subsequently novated to the new company independently of the administration. The original Harley company remains in liquidation (as of October 2019) pending the outcome of negotiations with HMRC concerning a £1.6m claim surrounding allegations of the use of tax avoidance schemes.

Although Rydon was the main contractor responsible for the 2015-2016 refurbishment of the Chalcots Estate and Grenfell Tower (destroyed by fire in June 2017), it sub-contracted the "design and installation of the external cladding" to Harley Curtain Wall (later Harley Facades).

In response to a request filed on behalf of several invidividuals and companies linked to the Grenfell Tower refurbishment (including both Rydon and Harley Facades), the Attorney General for England and Wales, Suella Braverman, confirmed that witnesses would be immune from prosecution based on their statements to the enquiry.

References

External links

British companies established in 1996
Construction and civil engineering companies of the United Kingdom
Construction and civil engineering companies established in 1996